The Academy Palace or Palace of the Academies is a neoclassical palace in Brussels, Belgium. It was originally built between 1823 and 1828 for Prince William II of Orange. Today, it houses five Belgian academies including the Royal Academies for Science and the Arts of Belgium (RASAB). In English, it is also often called the Academy House. 

The palace is situated on the / in the Royal Quarter (eastern part of Brussels' city centre), next to the /, the Royal Palace of Brussels and Brussels Park. This area is served by Brussels Central Station, as well as by the metro stations Parc/Park (on lines 1 and 5) and Trône/Troon (on lines 2 and 6).

History

The Palace of William II
The rather austere neoclassical palace and its stables were built between 1823 and 1828 for Prince William II of Orange in recognition of his brilliant action on the battlefield at Waterloo, from funds granted by the nation. It was the joint work of two architects,  and Tilman-François Suys, at a total cost of 1.2 million florins.

The princely family of William of Orange and his princess, Anna Pavlovna, sister of tsars Alexander I and Nicholas I, occupied the palace a scant two years before the Belgian Revolution of September 1830 forced them to flee to the Netherlands.

From 1830 to 1839, the palace was under sequestration by the newborn Belgian State, and a detailed inventory was drawn up. The public was allowed to tour the palace, and its interiors were considered the most sumptuous that had ever been seen in Belgium. An agreement on 5 November 1842 ceded the structure to the Belgian State, while its contents, adjudged the personal goods of William, were shipped to his Palace of Soestdijk in the Netherlands.

After housing the 1st Regiment of Chasseurs-Carabiniers in 1848–1852, and having been refused by the Duke of Brabant when offered to him in 1853, the palace remained in use for public festivities. The architect Gustave De Man, a member of the Académie Royale de Belgique ("Royal Academy of Belgium"), was entrusted with transformations, finished in 1862, which fitted the building to house the Musée Moderne ("Modern Museum").

The Academy Palace (1876–present)
Through a royal decree issued on 30 April 1876, the palace was put at the disposal of the two existing French-speaking Belgian academies: the Royal Academy of Science, Letters and Fine Arts of Belgium, which had been founded in 1772, and the Royal Academy of Medicine of Belgium founded in 1841. 

Three further academies came to share the space in the 20th century: the French-speaking Royal Academy of French Language and Literature of Belgium ( or ARLLFB) founded in 1920; the Dutch-speaking Royal Academy of Science, Letters and Fine Arts of Belgium founded in 1938 and called since 1999 the Royal Flemish Academy of Belgium for Science and the Arts ( or KVAB); and the Dutch-speaking Royal Academy of Medicine of Belgium, also founded in 1938.

Since 10 October 2001, the palace has been listed as a protected monument by the Monuments and Sites Directorate of the Brussels-Capital Region.

Garden
The Academy Palace is surrounded by a garden adorned with quite a few sculptures, including a statue of the astronomer Adolphe Quételet by Charles-Auguste Fraikin (1880), busts of the chemist Jean Servais Stas by Thomas Vinçotte on a pedestal designed by Victor Horta (1897), and the lawyer and politician Jules Destrée by Armand Bonnetain (1937), as well as The Surprise, a work with a dog and a turtle by Jean-Baptiste Van Heffen (1869). Around the pond, on the side of the /, there are three statues on high pedestals: a replica of The Discobolus by Matthieu Kessels (1867), The Victor by Jean Geefs, and Cain Cursed by Louis Jehotte (1850).

The garden is enclosed by a balustrade. At the entrance, two monumental allegorical lion sculptures by Félix Bouré flank the entrance gates. The young Rodin also contributed to the execution of the sculptural group on a pedestal, symbolising Science, Trade and Agriculture (1874).

See also
 Royal Institute for Cultural Heritage
 List of castles and châteaux in Belgium
 Neoclassical architecture in Belgium
 History of Brussels
 Belgium in "the long nineteenth century"

References

Notes

Bibliography

External links

 Le Palais des Académies/Paleis der Academiën

Palaces in Brussels
City of Brussels
Protected heritage sites in Brussels
Neoclassical architecture in Belgium
Neoclassical palaces
Belgian culture
1828 establishments in the Netherlands